Ron Cowen is an American writer and producer. He is a partner with Daniel Lipman in the television production company Cowlip Productions.

Filmography

As a writer
 Queer as Folk (2000–2005) TV Series (developed by, writer) with Daniel Lipman
 Sisters (1991) TV Series (created by, writer) with Daniel Lipman
 The Love She Sought (1990) (TV film) with Daniel Lipman 
 An Early Frost (1985) (TV film) with Daniel Lipman
 Knots Landing (1984) with Daniel Lipman
 Emerald Point N.A.S. with Daniel Lipman
 Paul's Case (1980) (TV film)
 Family (1976/III) (TV Series, writer) with Daniel Lipman
 I'm a Fool (1976) (TV film)
 Saturday Adoption (1968) (original play for TV)

As a producer
 Queer as Folk (2000–2005) TV Series (executive producer) with Daniel Lipman
 Sisters (1991) TV Series (executive producer) with Daniel Lipman
 The Love She Sought (1990) (TV) (co-producer) with Daniel Lipman
 An Early Frost (1985) (TV) (associate producer) with Daniel Lipman

Theatre
Gene & Jean, co-playwright (with Daniel Lipman)
Summertree (1967), playwright
Valentine's Day (1968), libretto and lyrics, revised 1975
Porcelain Time (1972), playwright
The Book of Murder (1974), playwright
Inside Lulu (1974), playwright
Unnatural Acts (1975), co-playwright, three one-acts (with Daniel Lipman)
Betty Blue Eyes (2011), co-librettist, musical (with Daniel Lipman)

References

External links
 

American male screenwriters
Living people
Primetime Emmy Award winners
American dramatists and playwrights
American male dramatists and playwrights
1944 births